The Dissolve was a film review, news, and commentary website which was operated by Pitchfork and based in Chicago, Illinois. The site was focused on reviews, commentary, interviews, and news about contemporary and classic films. Its editor was Scott Tobias, the former editor in chief of The A.V. Club. Editorial director Keith Phipps announced The Dissolve's closure on July 8, 2015.

History 
After Phipps parted from The A.V. Club, he felt he wanted to focus his career on writing about film opposed to the wide-ranging topics that The A.V. Club discusses. The site launched on July 10, 2013. In the first two weeks of publication, The Dissolve was set to present the following regular articles: The Conversation, which is a weekly discussion between The Dissolve writers about current films and a Movie of the Week feature, where the staff focuses on a film of their choosing for several days.

On July 8, 2015, The Dissolve announced its closure with editorial director Keith Phipps stating, "Sadly, because of the various challenges inherent in launching a freestanding website in a crowded publishing environment, financial and otherwise, today is the last day we will be doing that." Scott Tobias—in an interview with Indiewire—stated, "This was simply a case of everyone trying their best to make something great and the economics not being kind to those efforts." Former The Dissolve writers Scott Tobias, Keith Phipps, and Tasha Robinson later went on to develop the Next Picture Show podcast.

Staff 

Aside from Phipps, The Dissolve original staff comprised five of his former A.V. Club colleagues: Scott Tobias, Nathan Rabin, Genevieve Koski, Tasha Robinson, and Noel Murray. Staff members Noel Murray left The Dissolve to write freelance status in September 2014, and news editor Matt Singer left to contribute to ScreenCrush in November. Critic Nathan Rabin left the site in May 2015.

The staff also included news editor Rachel Handler, replacing Matt Singer, and contributors Mike D'Angelo and Sam Adams.

Ratings 

The Dissolve film rankings in comparison to other film reviews tended to be more harsh in their 1,555 reviews aggregated by Metacritic, who stated that on average, the website grades films 8.9 points lower than other critics from a 0–100 scale. Their average score is 56. Out of all the reviews, 566 were considered positive, 770 were considered mixed, and 219 were considered negative.

The Dissolve Film of the Year

References

External links 
 The Dissolve (official website; still online, but no longer updated)

Film magazines published in the United States
Online magazines published in the United States
Defunct magazines published in the United States
Defunct American websites
American film review websites
Magazines established in 2013
Magazines disestablished in 2015
Magazines published in Chicago
Internet properties disestablished in 2015